Portets is a commune in the Gironde department in Nouvelle-Aquitaine in southwestern France. Portets station has rail connections to Langon and Bordeaux.

Population

See also
Château de Mongenan, a chateau and botanical garden
Communes of the Gironde department

References

External links

Official site

Communes of Gironde